Fabio Perini (born 1940) is an Italian entrepreneur and inventor, founder of Perini Navi shipyard (1983), of the machinery company Fabio Perini S.p.A. (1966) and of Faper Group S.p.A. (2001). He is also Honorary Chairman and founder of Futura S.p.A and founder of the Perini Business Park. He was awarded the Leonardo Qualità Italia award in 2007.

His inventive abilities have allowed him to create world-leading activities in the fields of boating and engineering based on the innovation of his patents.

Biography

Perini was born in Vorno, in Tuscany into a family of paper entrepreneurs.

His entrepreneurial activity started in the paper machinery industry, a relevant economic sector in Lucca, the area where Perini is born. At the age of 20, in 1960, Fabio Perini patented machinery for automatic cutting of tissue paper.

Fabio Perini S.p.A. (1966 - 1994)
In 1966  Perini founded in Lucca the Fabio Perini company, an individual mechanical engineering business specialized in design and manufacturing of industrial machinery for the paper making industry and the tissue converting industry.

The company develops innovative machinery in the paper converting field, achieving growing success which leads it to change, in 1973, into a joint-stock company. Fabio Perini S.p.A. expands to become a multinational group with offices on three continents, a world leader capable of covering 75% of the tissue paper converting machinery market. Starting in the 1970s, in fact, Fabio Perini created an international network of companies: Perini France (1974), Perini Brazil (1975), Perini Deutschland (1976), Perini America (1978), Perini UK (1984), Perini Japan ( 1984), Perini Hong Kong (1985) and Perini Central America (1990).

In 1994  Perini sold the company to the German multinational group Körber PaperLink to devote himself to his business Perini Navi, which he had founded in the 1980s.

Perini Navi (1983 - )
In the early eighties Fabio Perini started a new entrepreneurial activity by founding the Perini Navi shipyards with the aim of designing and building large sailing superyachts. Perini invented a system that makes it possible to command large boats (over 40 metres) with small crews . The Perini Navi revolution was based on three principles:

Automatic control of the sails thanks to the invention of the captive reel winch, a system for winding the sheets and halyards on horizontal drums controlled by electric or hydraulic motors, and equipped with electronic sensors able to perceive excessive load conditions, discharging the wind from the sails and thus protecting boat and crew from potential maneuvering errors
Internal comfort comparable to that of motor yachts, with large living spaces inside the deckhouse and the entire sleeping area below deck
Introduction for the first time of a flying bridge on a sailboat, to optimize visibility under sail and allow guests and owner to enjoy open-air navigation

Perini Navi has launched 52 ships since 1983, becoming the world's leading company in the design and construction of large luxury sailing ships (ketch and sloop) (63% of the world market of the 40+ in 2002).

In May 2017, the Tabacchi family joined Perini Navi and assumed its operational and strategic management, as well as 100% ownership.

In December 2021 Perini Navi was taken over by The Italian Sea Group.

Perini Business Park (1999 - )
In Joinville, Brazil, Fabio Perini launched the Perini Business Park, the largest technological-industrial park in South America. To start his new project, he founded Perville, a construction company that will follow the construction of the Perini Park.

Faper Group S.p.A. (2001 - )
Faper Group was founded by Fabio Perini in 2001 and operates from the Viareggio headquarters. Born as an aggregator reference for the innovative tissue mechanics sector, today it is specialized in engineering solutions for tissue paper, sterilization systems and real-estate. It has been led by CEO Fabio Boschi since 2009.

Futura Converting (2003 - )
In 2003 Fabio Perini, after having sold the company of the same name to the German Körber, restarted in the sector of industrial machines for tissue with the new engineering company, creates the new engineering company Futura. The company develops new patents that allow it to produce innovative machinery, becoming one of the leading companies in the sector under the guidance of Perini.

Today Futura together with Perini Navi, Picchiotti and Cisa is part of the Faper Group.

Awards and honours
Order of Merit for Labour (1991)
Superyacht Society Award for Leadership (2004)
Capital Entrepreneur of the year (2007)
Italian Quality Committee - Leonardo Award (2007)

References

External links
 Perini Navi official website
Faper Group official website

1940 births
Living people
People from the Province of Lucca
20th-century Italian inventors